The Roman Catholic Diocese of Marbel (Lat: Dioecesis Marbeliana) is a Roman Rite diocese of the Latin Church of the Catholic Church in the Philippines.

History
Erected in 1960, as the territorial prelature of Marbel, the prelature was elevated in 1982 to a full diocese. The diocese is a suffragan of the Archdiocese of Cotabato and is currently headed by Bishop Cerilo Uy Casicas on April 29, 2018 by Pope Francis.

South Cotabato occupies the southern portion of what used to be the entire province of Cotabato.  This resulted from a political participation of the province into two Cotabato in 1967. The territory is bounded on the east by Davao del Sur, on the west by what is now Cotabato Province and the Moro Gulf, on the north by Cotabato alone and on the south by the Celebes Sea and Sarangani Bay.

It is also where Dole Philippines has over 80 square kilometers of pineapple plantations, and a sister company is involved in the production of Cavendish bananas.  The pineapple cannery alone employs thousands of workers and is a major activity of the province. The fishing industry is also extending from the surrounding waters of Sarangani Bay and the Celebes Sea.

The capital city is Koronadal, formerly known as Marbel, hence the name of the diocese. It hosts the Cathedral of Christ the King, the seat of the Bishop of Marbel.

Disaster response
Mt. Parker broke off in September 1995, inundating surrounding areas with mud and water from its interior lake, causing heavy casualties in life and property, prompting a response from the diocese.

Composition
The Diocese of Marbel comprises the civil provinces of South Cotabato, Sarangani and some parts of Sultan Kudarat. It has a land area of 10,000 square kilometers and a population of 1,094,770, of which 80 percent are Catholics.  Marbel was made a prelature on December 17, 1960. On November 15, 1982, it was elevated into a diocese, remaining a suffragan of the Diocese of Cotabato. Its titular patron is Christ the King, whose feast is celebrated toward the end of November.

Missionary efforts
Its mission is integral evangelization:  massive education in the faith, contextualized worship, and social apostolate. The thrust of its program is geared to the building and strengthening of mga gagmay nga Kristohanong katilingban or small Christian communities (BECs) toward integral liberation and development in order to bring about the "New Self," and the "New Earth," thereby glorifying God.

Community
The Diocese of South Cotabato has 22 parishes and 2 missions attended to by 65 priests. It has 15 religious brothers and 93 religious sisters doing varied works in the community. Among its Catholic institutions are 1 university, 2 colleges, 24 high schools, 34 elementary schools and 9 kindergarten schools.  It also has 2 hospitals, 3 homes for dependent children, 1 home for adults, and 8 retreat centers.  The total number of BECs has now reached 1,242.

The diocesan pastoral offices include the Commissions on Christian Formation, Social Action, Worship and Liturgy. The diocesan lay associations include those of the Lay Liturgical Leaders, the Lay Liturgists, the Knights of Columbus, the Parish Pastoral Councils, the BCC/GKK Practitioners, the Kriska Alagads, the Catholic Youth Ministry, the Family and Life Ministry, and the Catechists.

Ordinaries

See also
Catholic Church in the Philippines

References

Marbel
Marbel
Christian organizations established in 1960
Roman Catholic dioceses and prelatures established in the 20th century
Notre Dame Educational Association
1960 establishments in the Philippines
Religion in South Cotabato
Koronadal